Hypomasculinity is a psychological term for the absence of male stereotypical traits. For example, it is the absence of the de-emphasising of feelings and relationships. Oftentimes, individuals who exhibit hypomasculine traits display unmasculine professional or physical characteristics that deviate from the norm.

A Jungian interpretation of this would be of an overwhelmingly strong anima or female complex. This term can be pejorative and it is important not to place a moral interpretation on whether it is desirable, only by whether it is adaptive or maladaptive. Its opposite behavior is termed hypermasculinity.

Anorexia nervosa 

Hypomasculinity is commonly attained by male anorexics. The hypomasculinity includes a demasculinized physique and actual reduction or cessation of sexual functioning as a result of deliberate malnutrition.

See also

References

Men
Gender roles
Masculinity